Orchard Beach may refer to:
 Orchard Beach, Maryland, a populated place on a tidal river
 Orchard Beach State Park, Michigan, on Lake Michigan
 Orchard Beach, Bronx, New York, a beach on Long Island Sound

See also
 Old Orchard Beach, Maine, a town on the Gulf of Maine